The Sony Open in Hawaii is a professional golf tournament on the PGA Tour, and is part of the tour's FedEx Cup Series. It has been contested at the Waialae Country Club in Honolulu, Hawaii, since the event's modern-day inception as the Hawaiian Open in November 1965.

In addition to the usual PGA Tour eligibility criteria, the Sony Open may invite up to three professional golfers from emerging markets.

History

Originally a mid-autumn event for its first five editions, it was skipped in 1970 as it moved to its winter slot in early February 1971. Currently, it is held in mid-January and is the first full-field event of the calendar year, following the Tournament of Champions on Maui. The front and back nines of Waialae are switched for the PGA Tour event, finishing at the dogleg ninth hole.

The first lead sponsor was United Airlines in 1991, succeeded by current sponsor Sony in 1999. There have been five multiple winners of the tournament, all two-time champions: Hubert Green, Corey Pavin, Lanny Wadkins, Ernie Els, and Jimmy Walker. All have won major championships. The tournament is currently organized by Friends of Hawaii Charities.

In 1983, forty-year-old Isao Aoki became Japan's first winner on the PGA Tour. He holed out a wedge shot for an eagle-3 on the 72nd hole to beat Jack Renner by a stroke.

In 1998, John Huston broke the then PGA Tour scoring record to par. He shot 28 under par, beating Ben Hogan's record originally set in 1945.

The Sony Open gained attention for granting four consecutive sponsor invitations (PGA Tour Exemption #11) to Michelle Wie, the first in 2004 when she was age 14. She missed the cut in all four appearances, and did not receive one of the four available sponsor exemptions in 2008. One of the invitations went to Alex Ching, a 17-year-old former high school classmate of Wie.

In 2007, amateur Tadd Fujikawa become the second youngest player ever (16 years, 4 days) to make a 36-hole cut in an official PGA Tour event. His achievement was highlighted by a  eagle putt on his 36th hole, Waialae's 551-yard par-5 18th. Incidentally, the PGA Tour's 2006 media guide shows that the youngest player ever to make a 36-hole cut in an official Tour event was Bob Panasik (15 years, 8 months, and 20 days) in 1957 at the Canadian Open, 3½ months younger than Fujikawa.

Preparations for the 2018 Sony Open were briefly disrupted by a false emergency alert stating that a ballistic missile had been launched toward Hawaii. Staff members reportedly attempted to take shelter in the players' locker room, the media center was ordered to evacuate, and several players posted messages on social media about the erroneous alert, which was sent to all smartphones in the state. The alert was ultimately determined to have been sent in error. Before the final round, Golf Channel cameramen also staged a walkout.

Winners

Note: Green highlight indicates scoring records.

Previous incarnations recognized by PGA Tour

Multiple winners
Five men have won this tournament more than once through 2023.

2 wins
Hubert Green: 1978, 1979
Corey Pavin: 1986, 1987
Lanny Wadkins: 1988, 1991
Ernie Els: 2003, 2004
Jimmy Walker: 2014, 2015

Records
Tournament record: 253 (Justin Thomas, 2017)
54-hole record: 188 (Justin Thomas, 2017)
36-hole record: 123 (Justin Thomas, 2017)
18-hole record: 59 (Justin Thomas, 2017)

References

Notes

External links

Coverage on the PGA Tour's official site

PGA Tour events
Golf in Hawaii
Sports in Honolulu
Recurring sporting events established in 1965
1965 establishments in Hawaii
Sony